is a planned community development in the city of Sakura, Chiba Prefecture, Japan.  While the name of the development translates as “eucalyptus hills”, Australian Eucalyptus trees do not occur in the area naturally.

Yūkarigaoka serves as a bedroom community due to its proximity to central Tokyo. It is located roughly 60 minutes by the Keisei Electric Railway from Ueno Station. Yukarigaoka Station, built specifically for the new town development, is served by the Keisei Line and Yamaman Yūkarigaoka Line. The raised Yamaman Yūkarigaoka Line, which exclusively serves Yūkarigaoka, is a people mover system with a koala logo.  At least one hotel and a large multi-story shopping centre support the area.  

The movie Ainshutain Gāru (アインシュタインガール), or "Einstein Girl", takes place in Yūkarigaoka, and features the high-rise apartments, scenery such as Lake Inbanuma, and the Yamaman Yukarigaoka people mover.

Gallery

External links 
  Official website

Populated places in Chiba Prefecture
New towns in Japan
New towns started in the 1970s
Sakura, Chiba